Pražská pětka is a Czechoslovak comedy film released in 1988.

External links
 

1988 films
Czechoslovak fantasy films
1988 fantasy films
Czech fantasy films
1980s Czech films